

External links 

2012 in United States case law